Aposthonia is a genus of webspinners of the family Oligotomidae. The genus was described by Krauss in 1911.

Species
Species of this genus include

 Aposthonia aurea
 Aposthonia borneensis
 Aposthonia brunnea
 Aposthonia ceylonica
 Aposthonia davisi
 Aposthonia glauerti
 Aposthonia gurneyi
 Aposthonia hainanensis
 Aposthonia himalayensis
 Aposthonia hollandia
 Aposthonia jacobsoni
 Aposthonia japonica
 Aposthonia josephi
 Aposthonia maerens
 Aposthonia mandibulata
 Aposthonia maritima
 Aposthonia micronesiae
 Aposthonia oceania
 Aposthonia oculata
 Aposthonia tillyardi
 Aposthonia varians Aposthonia vosseleri''

References

Oligotomidae
Insect genera
Taxa named by Hermann August Krauss